Trstenik is a town and municipality located in the Rasina District of central Serbia. As of 2011 census, the town has 15,329, while the municipality has 42,989 inhabitants. It lies on the West Morava river.

History
In the Early and Middle Iron Age, the tribe of Triballi inhabited the West Morava. Romans conquered the area in the 1st century AD. Roman sites include the Stražbe castrum on the right bank of the river, as well as sites in Bučje and Donji Dubić, and others still unexplored. The Romans introduced the Vitis vinifera (Common Grape Vine) to the region, which still today is processed in Serbian wineyards (It is one of the main incomes in the municipality).
 
In the Middle Ages, Trstenik belonged to the West Morava oblast (province). The first written record of Trstenik is from Prince Lazar's Ravanica charter dated 1381, in which he donated Trstenik to the Ravanica monastery. The Ljubostinja monastery was built in the Morava architectural style.

In 1427, the Ottoman Empire conquered the areas of Kruševac and Trstenik. In the Western Morava valley, the Ottomans built the Grabovac fortress. After the final fall of the Serbian Despotate in 1459, Trstenik became an important Ottoman caravan stop. In an Austrian report dated 1784, Trstenik had 47 Muslim and 17 Christian houses, stone mosques, two inns and a few craft shops. At that time Trstenik was located 2 km west of the present town, near the village of Osaonica.

After receiving autonomy of the Principality of Serbia, Miloš Obrenović ordered the construction of a new settlement on the right bank of the Western Morava in the period 1832-1838. In the 1870s, Trstenik got a primary school, a post office, a pharmacy, a bank and the first steam mill. In 1899, west across the river, a steel bridge was built, and the following year the Church of the Holy Trinity was built. Stalać-Kraljevo railroad opened in 1910.

From 1929 to 1941, Trstenik was part of the Morava Banovina of the Kingdom of Yugoslavia.

After World War II new facilities were built and a large part of the old quarters dates from this period. After World War II, Trstenik suffered significant industrial development with the establishment of the factory hydraulic and pneumatic systems First five years. During the period of sanctions in the 1990s, the city stagnated.

Demographics

According to the 2011 census results, the municipality of Trstenik has a population of 42,966 inhabitants.

Ethnic groups
The ethnic composition of the municipality:

Economy

As of 2017, key industrial companies in Trstenik are mechanical manufacturer PPT-Petoletka and defense company PPT-Namenska, both being the successors of once-great manufacturing company "Prva Petoletka" which employed nearly 20,000 employees at its peak during the 1980s.

The following table gives a preview of total number of registered people employed in legal entities per their core activity (as of 2018):

Visitor attractions

 Ljubostinja - is a Serbian Orthodox monastery near Trstenik, Serbia. Located in the small mountain valley of the Ljubostinja river. It is dedicated to the Holy Virgin. The monastery was built from 1388 to 1405. Burials in the monastery include Princess Milica, Lazar Hrebeljanović's wife and Nun Jefimija, which after the Battle of Kosovo here became a nun along with a number of other widows of Serbian noblemen who lost their life's in the battles on the river Maritsa and Kosovo Polje. Today Ljubostinja is female monastery which preserves and maintains about fifty nuns. During the rebellion of Kočine, the people were invited on rebellion from the Ljubostinje monastery. After the collapse of rebellion Turks burned the monastery to revenge the Serbs, and most of the frescoes were destroyed. Also, when the monastery was set on fire  a secret treasure was discovered that was hidden in the monastery wall behind icons in which the Princess Milica hid their treasure. Among the stolen treasure was located Crown of Prince Lazar, which is now located in Istanbul. Ljubostinja was declared Monument of Culture of Exceptional Importance in 1979, and it is protected by Republic of Serbia.
 Veluće Monastery

Notable people
 Vladimir Jugović, former footballer, European cup champion
 Marko Baša (born 1982), Montenegrin footballer
 Nebojša Bradić (born 1956), politician, minister of culture 
 Dobrica Ćosić (born 1921), writer and political theorist, president of the FR Yugoslavia
 Jovana Vojinović (1992), chess player
 Verica Kalanović, politician and three-time minister
 Dragiša Binić, footballer (Living in the municipality Trstenik)
 Vladislav F. Ribnikar, Serbian journalist, founder of daily newspaper Politika

Photo gallery

See also
 Trstenik Airport
 Ljubostinja

References

External links

 

 
Populated places in Rasina District
Municipalities and cities of Šumadija and Western Serbia